Waris is a 1969 Indian Hindi-language masala film, produced by Vasu Menon and directed by Ramanna. The film stars Jeetendra and Hema Malini, with music composed by R. D. Burman. It is a remake of the Tamil film Naan (1967).

Plot
The film begins in a royal dynasty where its heir prince Ram Kumar quits the house owing to his father Raja Raghunath's arrogant nature and low regard for the poor. After 20 years, on his deathbed, Raja Saab entrusts the responsibility to fetch Ram Kumar to a committee holding Birbal, Thakurain, and James providing his identification marks, mannerisms, etc. Raja Saab also aspires to wedlock his Diwan‘s daughter Geeta to Ram Kumar who takes care of his little kid Munni. Surprisingly, three Ram Kumars arrive with the proofs. Here, Ram Kumar-2 gains the affection of Munni and also the heart of Geeta. After a few comic incidents, Ram Kumar-1 is revealed as Murthy, son of Rukmani the foster mother Ram Kumar that captivated him. Moreover, Murthy is a member of a netherworld ring chaired by a monster. Whereas Ram Kumar-2 is Ravi, brother of Kumar’s beau Komal and Ram Kumar-3 is CBI officer Rajan appointed to find the fact.

Meanwhile, the committee learns the whereabouts of Rukmani when crafty Murthy falsifies by showing endanger to Kumar and makes her affirm him as the real heir. At that juncture, the remaining two ask for some time to prove their righteousness and they unite. On the eve of Ram Kumar’s birthday, Murthy intrigues to knock out Ravi & Rajan with his gang men who assume Rajan is dead. Following this, Ravi is on the verge to reveal Murthy's conspiracy but the arrival of Komal makes him expel. Now, the committee declares Murthy as Ram Kumar and gearing up to hand over the testament. Meanwhile, Ravi & Rajan free Ram Kumar who is startled to know about Rukmani. Afterward, discerns the reality and divulges the fact to Rukmani.

Then, she immediately brings the truth to the limelight which is denied and necks them out. Eventually, Murthy again seizes Ram Kumar along with Rukmani and ploys to knit Geeta. Anyhow, Ravi & Rajan breaks it, and escape with Geeta and the testament. To acquire it, Murthy extorts Komal by jeopardizing Kumar. So, she silently snatches and surrenders it when Murthy betrayals her by latching her. Ultimately, Ravi protects them and ceases the gang. The next, Rajan unveils the nefarious shade of Murthy when he tries to abscond with the treasure. At last, Rukmani sacrifices her life while guarding Kumar and also kills Murthy. Finally, the movie ends on a happy note with the marriages of Ravi & Geeta and Ram Kumar & Komal.

Cast
 Jeetendra as Ravi/Ram Kumar #2
 Hema Malini as Geeta
 Neetu Singh as Baby Sonia
 Master Sachin as Young Ram Kumar
 Prem Chopra as Murthy/Ram Kumar #1
 Mehmood as CID Inspector Rajan/Ram Kumar #3/ Rajan's mother
 Aruna Irani
 Kamini Kaushal as Rukmani
 Shylashri
 Nazima as Komal
 Sudesh Kumar as Original Ram Kumar 
 David as Diwanji

Reception
The film was well received by the audience.

Mehmood and Aruna Irani had made a successful comedy team in Aulad (1968), produced a year earlier. Their next pairing was Waris and the audience's appreciation helped in their working together in several films. Mehmood won the Filmfare Award for Best Performance in a Comic Role for this movie.

Soundtrack
The film's score was composed by Rahul Dev Burman and lyrics were penned by Rajendra Krishan. It had playback by Lata Mangeshkar, Asha Bhosle and Mohammed Rafi. A popular number was the parody song, "Chahe Koi Mujhe Bhoot Kaho" where Burman mixed a medley of numbers from different films like Junglee (1961), Brahmachari (1968) and An Evening In Paris (1967).{All Shanker JaikIshen compositions.}.

References

External links 

1960s Hindi-language films
1969 films
Films directed by T. R. Ramanna
Films scored by R. D. Burman
Hindi remakes of Tamil films
1960s masala films